Ciudad Insurgentes is a city in the Mexican state of Baja California Sur. It is the second-largest community in the municipality of Comondú and is located 250 kilometers north of La Paz, Baja California Sur, and 175 kilometers south of Loreto, Baja California Sur. Ciudad Insurgentes's population was 11,503 inhabitants in the 2015 census.

References
 2010 census tables: INEGI

Comondú Municipality
Populated places in Baja California Sur